Crocidolomia subhirsutalis is a moth in the family Crambidae. It was described by Schaus in 1927. It is found in the Philippines (Luzon).

References

Evergestinae
Moths described in 1927